Manang Marshyangdi Club is a Nepali professional football club based in Kathmandu, that competes in the Martyr's Memorial A-Division League. The club is record champion of Nepalese football, having won 8 National Championship Titles. Historically, they have a fierce rivalry with Three Star Club and Nepal Police Club, a departmental team. The other rival includes New Road Team. 

Manang Marshyangdi Club has its origins in Pokhara, for which it hosted selsected home matches at Pokhara Rangasala since 2021–22 Martyr's Memorial A-Division League. However, officially, the club is based in Swayambhu, Kathmandu.

Kit colours
For much of Manang's history, their home colours have been sky blue & white shirts as they use the Argentinian football team jerseys and white shorts, though this has not always been the case.

Their current colours are:

Jerseys :	Blue & White/Green & White/Red
Shorts :	Black & White/Green & White /Red
Socks :	Sky Blue/ Green/ Red

Club history

Season 2068 B.S. (2011–12)
Manang Marshyandi started the season with a blast featuring the most expensive side with the names like Anil Gurung and Santosh Sahukhala.
They also roped in Korean coach Lee Tae-Ho which led the long-serving coach Balgopal Maharjan to become the deputy coach and finally being relieved from coaching duties. The side finished second, level on points with the champions Nepal Police Club, missing out due to goal difference. Their only consolation was beating the Police in the final (17th) round. They were promoted to play the first ever Nepal National League.

Season 2069 B.S. (2012–13)
The club was reorganised and Krishna Thapa was appointed as the new head coach. This also saw a new influx of talents. The season started brightly as they won both Ncell Cup and Safal Cup. They also won the Martyr's Memorial League by beating Tribhuvan Army Club(TAC).

Season 2070 B.S. (2013–14)
The 2013–14 Martyr's Memorial A-Division League (known as the Martyrs' Memorial Red Bull 'A' Division League Football Tournament 2013–14 for sponsorship reasons)(Nepali: 2013–14 शहीद स्मारक ए-डिभिजन लिग) was the 41st edition of Martyr's Memorial A-Division League. The league started on 30 December 2013 and finished on 1 March 2014 in the Dasarath Rangasala Stadium. Thirteen teams competed with each other in single round-robin format with the top 6 qualifying for the Super Six stage. Three Star Club were the defending champions. Manang Marshyangdi Club won the title for the record 7th time.

In October 2014, they participated in Sikkim Governor's Gold Cup and reached to the final with a 3–1 win over Sikkim FA. but lost to ONGC FC in the title winning match through penalty shoot-out.

Season 2071–72 B.S. (2015)
The 2015 Nepal National League also known as the Redbull National League for sponsorship reasons was the 2nd edition of Nepal National League. There were 9 teams that will featured in the league. Three Star Club became Champion beating Manang Marsyangdi Club in the last game of the league. The Champion received 10 million rupees. The League was heavily affected by the April 2015 Nepal earthquake, with play being suspended from late April and due to resume in September.

Rivalries
The club does face the Nepal Police Club & Patan side Three Star Club on different competition and can be considered as their main rivals. The rivalries have escalated due to their top forms. Also they have rivalries with Nepal Army Club, and New Road Team.

Supporters
Manang Marshyangdi have a large and generally loyal fanbase all over Nepal, with virtually all matches with their regular supporters. The team is called by their friends as "Manange" referring to the roots of the founders of the club from Manang District of Nepal. Manang Marsyangdi Club forever is their officially recognised first fan group of Nepal.

Kit manufacturers and shirt sponsors

Club officials
Board of directors
President: Vijay Ghale 
General secretary: Tenzing Gurung
Treasurer: Karma Gurung

Honours

Domestic 
 Martyr's Memorial A-Division League
 Champions (8): 1986, 1987, 1989, 2000, 2003,  2005–06,  2018–19

Invitational
 Sikkim Gold Cup
Champions (1): 2018
 King's Cup (Bhutan)
Champions (1): 2018

Jigme Dorji Wangchuk Memorial Gold Cup
Champions (1): 2013

Others
Buddha Subba Gold Cup: (3)
 2004, 2016, 2020
Khukuri Gold Cup: (1)
 2003
San Miguel Itahari Gold Cup: (1)
 2007
Aaha! Gold Cup: (6)
 2004, 2005, 2012, 2016, 2017, 2020.
Aadarsha Cup: (1)
 2011
Simara Gold Cup: (1)
 2012
Ncell Cup: (1)
 2012
Pokhara Cup: (1)
 2012
 2013
Jhapa Gold Cup: (1)
2017

Performance in AFC competitions
 Asian Club Championship: 1 appearance
1988: Qualifying Stage
AFC President's Cup: 2 appearances
 2006: Group stage
 2014: Final Stage
 AFC Cup: 1 appearance
 2019: Group stage

Continental record

Current squad

League finishes
The season-by-season performance of MMC since 2000:

References

External links
Official website
MMC Forever official song

Football clubs in Nepal
1982 establishments in Nepal